Hendrik Daniel Petrus Dames (born 7 February 1986, in Koës) is a Namibian international rugby union player, who most recently played with . He can play as a winger or a full-back.

Career

Youth

Dames represented the  side at the 2004 Craven Week tournament in Nelspruit. The following year, Dames was a member of the Namibia Under-19 squad that participated in the 2005 Under 19 Rugby World Championship in Durban.

Sharks

Leopards

He remained in Potchefstroom for 5 years, scoring 27 tries in 65 appearances for the Leopards in the Currie Cup and Vodacom Cup competitions.

Griquas

At the end of 2013, Dames joined Kimberley-based side .

International

Dames was also a member of the  squad for the 2011 Rugby World Cup in New Zealand, where he started 4 matches.

References

Namibian rugby union players
Living people
1986 births
People from ǁKaras Region
Griquas (rugby union) players
Leopards (rugby union) players
Sharks (Currie Cup) players
Rugby union wings
Namibia international rugby union players